Eto Na Naman Ako is a 2000 Philippine romantic action film directed by Ike Jarlego Jr. The film stars Robin Padilla (who co-wrote the film) and Vina Morales. It is loosely based on the 1992 film The Bodyguard.

Plot
Ana Maria (Vina), a successful singer-actress, puts her life in danger with a slew of death threats from her obsessed fan. To ensure her safety, she hires Abel (Robin), who  happens to be her childhood sweetheart, to be her bodyguard.

Cast
 Robin Padilla as Abet Dimaguiba
 Chris Padilla as Young Abet
 Vina Morales as Ana Maria Ledesma
 Iwi Nicolas as Young Ana
 Troy Montero as Vince Madrigal
 Candy Pangilinan as Silly
 Chinggoy Alonzo as Don Jaime Madrigal
 Rosemarie Gil as Doña Josefa Madrigal
 Charlie Davao as General Acosta
 Allan Paule as Gregory Valdez
 Boy Roque as Clayton Rosales
 July Hidalgo as Mara
 Royette Padilla as Hired Killer
 P.J. Oreta as Hired Killer's Accomplice
 Rico Miguel as Dennis Macaluno
 Boy Abunda as TV Host
 Kris Aquino as TV Host
 Lindsay Custodio as Vanessa Paterno
 Levi Ignacio as Vince's Friend at Party
 Vangie Labalan as Aling Maring
 Jeffrey Tam as Lalaking Praning
 Joe Jardi as Mang Ramon
 Gino Padilla as Dan
 June Hidalgo as Ana's Driver
 Jack Barri as Vince's Bodyguard
 Jun Arenas as Vince's Bodyguard
 Leychard Sicangco as Vince's Bodyguard
 Joey Sarmiento as TV Reporter
 Ed Aquino as Mr. Lee
 Ric Bernardo as MTV Director
 Paul Gutierrez as Mayor
 Gil Carino as Sniper

Production
Padilla was in Basilan when principal photography was supposed to begin. This prompted principal photography to be postponed for two weeks.

References

External links

2000 films
2000 action films
Filipino-language films
Philippine action films
Maverick Films films
Films directed by Ike Jarlego Jr.